Loei Province Stadium is a multi-purpose stadium in Loei Province, Thailand. It is currently used mostly for football matches and is the home stadium of Loei City F.C. The stadium holds 3,628 people.

Multi-purpose stadiums in Thailand
Buildings and structures in Loei province
Sport in Loei province